Ek Phnom ("First Mountain") is a district (srok)  of Battambang Province, in north western Cambodia.  The name means "only hill" in Khmer.

Administration 
The district is subdivided into 7 communes (khum).

Communes and villages

References 

 
Districts of Battambang province